Cabera quadrifasciaria, known generally as the four-lined cabera moth or four-lined cream moth, is a species of geometrid moth in the family Geometridae. It is found in North America.

The MONA or Hodges number for Cabera quadrifasciaria is 6680.

References

Further reading

 

Caberini
Articles created by Qbugbot
Moths described in 1873